Joung Da-woon (born April 23, 1989, Seoul) is a South Korean judoka. At the 2012 Summer Olympics she competed in the Women's 63 kg, but was defeated in the semifinals.  She beat Ramila Yusubova and Yoshie Ueno before losing to Xu Lili.  Because Xu reached the final Joung was entered into the repechage, where she lost her bronze medal match to Gévrise Émane.

Filmography

Television show

References

External links
 
 

Living people
Olympic judoka of South Korea
Judoka at the 2012 Summer Olympics
1989 births
Asian Games medalists in judo
Judoka at the 2014 Asian Games
South Korean female judoka
Asian Games gold medalists for South Korea
Asian Games silver medalists for South Korea
Medalists at the 2014 Asian Games
Universiade medalists in judo
People from Seoul
Universiade silver medalists for South Korea
Medalists at the 2013 Summer Universiade
21st-century South Korean women